Mangku Muriati (born in 1967) is a traditional-style Balinese painter and priestess from Kamasan village near Klungkung, Bali, Indonesia.

Mangku Muriati, born in 1967, paints in traditional Balinese form, known as Kamasan-style, where the aesthetic form and most stories relate to the wayang kulit puppet theatre. This form of painting has a very old tradition, associated with the East Javanese kingdom of Majapahit, which flourished in the fourteenth and fifteenth centuries and helped to propagate Hindu faith across the region – now largely retained in Bali. It was from the Kamasan village where artists were traditionally recruited to produce classical-style paintings on cloth (or bark cloth) for religious and ceremonial use as well as to decorate the palaces and temples.

Mangku Muriati is a daughter of Mangku Mura (1920-1999), who is considered one of the prominent artists of his generation in Kamasan-style painting [1].

As was common practice in artist families, Muriati used to help her father in colouring paintings from an early age, learning the craft of painting. She studied art at the Udayana University in Denpasar, Bali, but after graduating, returned to the traditional style of painting. Working as a Kamasan artist, she joined a small number of Balinese women who work in this style, customarily dominated by men.

In the 1990s, at the age of 32, Muriati became a priestess at her local clan temple in the ward of Banjar Siku. She considers painting and priestly duties as complementary, comparing the role of an artist to a dhalang or puppeteer, who needs an extensive knowledge of characters and stories, ultimately derived from what is considered the sacred scripture - the Hindu epics Ramayana and Mahabharata. The subjects of her paintings and related commentaries frequently refer to social and political issues in contemporary Bali. [3]

Muriati’s paintings have been exhibited in Bali as well as internationally.

See also 

Balinese art

References 

^ Adrian Vickers, Balinese Art: Paintings and Drawings of Bali 1800 - 2010, Tuttle Publishing 2012

^ Siobhan Campbell, Kamasan painting at the Australian Museum and beyond, Art Monthly Australia 2011) No. 244 (Oct): 51-54

^ Siobhan Campbell, A Balinese artist and temple priest builds on her father’s legacy, Inside Indonesia 106: Oct-Dec 2011

^ Siobhan Campbell, Collecting Balinese Art: The Forge Collection of the Balinese Paintings  at the Australian Museum in Sydney, Unpublished PhD thesis, University of Sydney 2013

^ Eric Buvelot, Mangku Mura Muriati regenere la peinture de Kamasan, La Gazette de Bali, Edition de mai 2010

^ Marielle Klosterman, Mangu Muriati Mura, Bali Now, 29 April 2013

^ Anthony Forge, Balinese Traditional Paintings, Australian Museum, Sydney 1978

External links 
 Balinese women artists
 Mangku Muriati in her studio 2011 - photos
 Mangku Muriati, Artist and Priestess
 A Balinese artist and temple priest builds on her father’s legacy
 /Mangku Mura Muriati - La Gazette de Bali 

1967 births
Living people
People from Klungkung Regency
Indonesian painters
Balinese people
Indonesian Hindu religious leaders
20th-century Hindu religious leaders
21st-century Hindu religious leaders